Carposina socors is a moth in the family Carposinidae. It was described by Edward Meyrick in 1928. It is found in South Africa.

The larvae feed on the fruits of Podocarpus species.

References

Endemic moths of South Africa
Carposinidae
Moths described in 1928
Moths of Africa